Amazichthys is an extinct genus of selenosteid arthrodire from the Middle Famennian of the Late Devonian of the Anti-Atlas Mountains of Morocco. It contains a single species, Amazichthys trinajsticae. It is one of a few example of placoderm known from whole body shape, including cartilaginous axial and fin elements.

Description  
Amazichthys had a profile similar to that of fast-moving pelagic fishes, with lateral keels for stability, and a lunate caudal fin, suggesting it could reach and maintain high speed.

Etymology  
Amazichthys trinajsticae was named after the North African ethnic group Amazigh (Berbers), and Australian palaeontologist Kate Trinajstic.

Taxonomy  
Amazichthys is part of Selenosteidae, a family inside the clade Aspinothoracidi, inside of Pachyosteomorphi, along with Dunkleosteoidea.

The cladogram shown here is based on Jobbins et al, 2022.

References

Arthrodire genera
Placoderms of Africa
Selenosteidae